Nicole Arendt and Manon Bollegraf were the defending champions but did not compete that year.

Alexandra Fusai and Nathalie Tauziat won in the final 6–1, 6–0 against Mariaan de Swardt and Jana Novotná.

Seeds
Champion seeds are indicated in bold text while text in italics indicates the round in which those seeds were eliminated.

 Alexandra Fusai /  Nathalie Tauziat (champions)
 Mariaan de Swardt /  Jana Novotná (final)
 Anna Kournikova /  Larisa Neiland (quarterfinals)
 Yayuk Basuki /  Caroline Vis (quarterfinals)

Draw

External links
 1998 Pilot Pen International Women's Doubles Draw

Connecticut Open (tennis)
Pilot Pen International – Women's Doubles
Women's Doubles